Yovany Aragon (born 2 May 1974) is a Cuban former baseball player, who starred for the Cuban national baseball team.

Aragon played for Cuba team in the 2000 Summer Olympic Games where his team won the silver medal.

References

1974 births
Living people
Olympic baseball players of Cuba
Olympic silver medalists for Cuba
Olympic medalists in baseball
Medalists at the 2000 Summer Olympics
Baseball players at the 2000 Summer Olympics
Pan American Games gold medalists for Cuba
Baseball players at the 2003 Pan American Games
Pan American Games medalists in baseball
Central American and Caribbean Games gold medalists for Cuba
Competitors at the 1998 Central American and Caribbean Games
Central American and Caribbean Games medalists in baseball
Medalists at the 2003 Pan American Games
20th-century Cuban people
21st-century Cuban people